John Hindle (6 April 1857 – 29 December 1927) was an Australian politician.

Born at Rishton in Lancashire to William Hindle and Elizabeth Woolstonecraft, he received a limited education and began working in a cotton factory at the age of eleven. After arriving in Melbourne in 1871, he established his own business in 1878. In 1881 he was President of the Salesman and Assistants Union. He married Robina Bardsley in 1882, with whom he had three daughters. He relocated to Sydney in 1884. From 1891 to 1894 he was the Labor member for Newtown in the New South Wales Legislative Assembly, although he would later join the Free Trade Party. Hindle died in Stanmore in 1927.

References

 

1857 births
1927 deaths
Members of the New South Wales Legislative Assembly
People from Rishton
English emigrants to Australia
Politicians from Melbourne
Politicians from Sydney
Australian Labor Party members of the Parliament of New South Wales